The Clock Watcher is a 1945 American animated short film produced by Walt Disney Productions and released by RKO Radio Pictures. The cartoon follows Donald Duck as he works at the Royal Bros. department store, where he goofs off by breaking gifts and wrapping them poorly.

Plot
Donald Duck arrives late to his job at Royal Bros. as a gift wrapper. He clocks in, uses a magnet to set the time back a few minutes, then situates himself at his work table. Toys come zooming down past him, creating a whirlwind that strips his clothes off. 

He quickly retrieves them and makes his way over to the pile of gifts. Donald plays with the toys and pretends to work at the same time. He then pulls out his lunch and pours coffee in his cup. The boss's speaker horn sneezes the coffee all over Donald's face and ends up watching him who starts throwing a temper tantrum. As the boss scolds him, Donald now apologizes. He tries to squeeze a trombone into a small box, he then squashes it with a clamp to make it look like a French horn. 

He then puts a ring and a rugby ball in the wrong boxes. After pretending to work and playing with a clock for a while, his boss announces that "Production has increased in every single department" except for the gift wrapping department. This makes Donald angry.

Donald sees a box containing a perfume come down the assembly line, and sprays it into the speaker pipe. The boss says that the smell is Comhither #5. Donald wraps a rocking chair with him inside it. Just as a rush order box comes, Donald gets out of his rocking chair and gets the wrapping paper out.

A pair of eyes look through the lid of the box, then suddenly pop out and Donald finds that it turns out to be a Jack-in-the-box character; he proceeds to play with Jack. When the boss tells him not to play with toys, he gets angry and has trouble with Jack in various ways and has trouble wrapping the box with Jack, who refuses to go back in. He uses a vise clamp to hold Jack down in order to put him back in the box.

He gets annoyed by the speaker horn and solves the problem by shoving a rubber ball in the speaker. The speaker shoots out the ball as Donald is trying to have his pie, and quickly dodges the ball, but is not fast enough to jump out of the way when the ball hits the clamp and forces Jack in his box to spring out and hit Donald into his pie piece. 

He then decides to tie down the Jack-in-the-box and hold him down by hammering stakes in the floor, only to hear that Jack in his box has gotten free of the stakes, before Donald looks out the window and is surprised that Jack went through the floor.

He then tries to pull Jack's head out, but ends up getting pulled into the box, then gets trapped inside, trying to wrestle with Jack until he finally gets free, but finds that Jack has stolen his blue shirt and hat while Donald Duck is wearing Jack's accordion-like clown costume, neck ruffle and nightcap.

He complains until the boss announces that it is quitting time. This excites him, until the boss tells Donald that he has to stay and wrap a few more packages. Donald gets angry and dashes upstairs to beat up his boss. He breaks the speaker pipe in the process before he quits the job.

Voice cast
Clarence Nash as Donald Duck

Home media
The short was released on December 6, 2005 on Walt Disney Treasures: The Chronological Donald, Volume Two: 1942-1946.

References

External links
 

1945 short films
1945 animated films
1940s Disney animated short films
Donald Duck short films
Films directed by Jack King
Films produced by Walt Disney
Films scored by Oliver Wallace
1940s English-language films
American animated short films
Films about ducks